Bariyarpur may refer to:

 Bariyarpur, Bara, Nepal
 Bariyarpur, Rautahat, Nepal